Artyom Vladimirovich Dylevsky (born 20 February 1997) is a Belarusian footballer who plays for Smorgon.

References

External links

1997 births
Living people
Belarusian footballers
Association football defenders
Belarusian expatriate footballers
Expatriate footballers in Kazakhstan
FC Minsk players
FC Belshina Bobruisk players
FC Lida players
FC Kaisar players
FC Smorgon players